Nikolčice is a municipality and village in Břeclav District in the South Moravian Region of the Czech Republic. It has about 800 inhabitants.

Notable people
Anton Rzehak (1855–1923), geologist and paleontologist

References

Villages in Břeclav District